Alexandria is an independent city in the northern region of the Commonwealth of Virginia, United States.

In 2020, the population was 159,467, making it the 6th most populous city in Virginia and the 169th most populous city in the nation. The city's estimated population has grown by 1% annually since 2010 on average.

Like the rest of Northern Virginia and Central Maryland, modern Alexandria has been influenced by its proximity to the U.S. capital. It is largely populated by professionals working in the federal civil service, in the U.S. military, or for one of the many private companies which contract to provide services to the federal government. One of Alexandria's largest employers is the U.S. Department of Defense. Another is the Institute for Defense Analyses. In 2005, the United States Patent and Trademark Office moved to Alexandria, and in 2017, so did the headquarters of the National Science Foundation.

The historic center of Alexandria is known as Old Town Alexandria (or simply "Old Town"). With its concentration of boutiques, restaurants, antique shops and theaters, it is a major draw for all who live in Alexandria as well as for visitors. Like Old Town, many Alexandria neighborhoods are compact and walkable. It is the 6th largest and highest-income independent city in Virginia. A large portion of adjacent Fairfax County, mostly south but also west of the city, has Alexandria mailing addresses. However, this area is under the jurisdiction of Fairfax County's government and separate from the independent city. The city is therefore sometimes referred to as the "City of Alexandria" to avoid confusion (see the "Neighborhoods" paragraph below). Additionally, neighboring Arlington County was formerly named "Alexandria County" before it was renamed by the Virginia General Assembly in 1920 to reduce confusion with the city.

History

Early history 
According to archaeologists' estimates, a succession of indigenous peoples began to occupy the Chesapeake and Tidewater region about 3,000 to 10,000 years ago. Various Algonquian-speaking peoples inhabited the lands in the Potomac River drainage area since at least the early 14th century.

In the summer of 1608, English settler John Smith explored the Potomac River and came into contact with the Patawomeck (loosely affiliated with the Powhatan) and Doeg tribes who lived on the Virginia side, as well as on Theodore Roosevelt Island, and the Piscataway (also known as the Conoy), who resided on the Maryland side. On this visit, Smith recorded the presence of a settlement called Assaomeck near the south bank of what is now Hunting Creek.

Colonial era 

On October 21, 1669, a patent granted  to Robert Howsing for transporting 120 people to the Colony of Virginia. That tract would later become the City of Alexandria. Virginia's comprehensive Tobacco Inspection Law of 1730 mandated that all tobacco grown in the colony must be brought to locally designated public warehouses for inspection before sale. One of the sites designated for a warehouse on the upper Potomac River was at the mouth of Hunting Creek. However, the ground proved to be unsuitable, and the warehouse was built half a mile up-river, where the water was deep near the shore.

Following the 1745 settlement of the Virginia's 10-year dispute with Lord Fairfax over the western boundary of the Northern Neck Proprietary, when the Privy Council in London found in favor of Lord Fairfax's expanded claim, some of the Fairfax County gentry formed the Ohio Company of Virginia. They intended to conduct trade into the interior of America, and they required a trading center near the head of navigation on the Potomac. The best location was Hunting Creek tobacco warehouse, since the deep water could easily accommodate sailing ships. Many local tobacco planters, however, wanted a new town further up Hunting Creek, away from nonproductive fields along the river.

Around 1746, Captain Philip Alexander II (1704–1753) moved to what is south of present Duke Street in Alexandria. At the opening of Virginia's 1748–49 legislative session, there was a petition submitted in the House of Burgesses on November 1, 1748, that the "inhabitants of Fairfax (Co.) praying that a town may be established at Hunting Creek Warehouse on Potowmack River," as Hugh West was the owner of the warehouse. The petition was introduced by Lawrence Washington, the representative for Fairfax County and, more importantly, the son-in-law of William Fairfax and a founding member of the Ohio Company. To support the company's push for a town on the river, Lawrence's younger brother George Washington, an aspiring surveyor, made a sketch of the shoreline touting the advantages of the tobacco warehouse site.

Since the river site was amidst his estate, Philip opposed the idea and strongly favored a site at the head of Hunting Creek (also known as Great Hunting Creek). It has been said that in order to avoid a predicament the petitioners offered to name the new town Alexandria, in honor of Philip's family. As a result, Philip and his cousin Captain John Alexander (1711–1763) gave land to assist in the development of Alexandria, and are thus listed as the founders. This John was the son of Robert Alexander II (1688–1735). On May 2, 1749, the House of Burgesses approved the river location and ordered "Mr. Washington do go up with a Message to the Council and acquaint them that this House have agreed to the Amendments titled An Act for erecting a Town at Hunting Creek Warehouse, in the County of Fairfax." A "Public Vendue" (auction) was advertised for July, and the county surveyor laid out street lanes and town lots. The auction was conducted on July 13–14, 1749.

Almost immediately upon establishment, the town founders called the new town "Belhaven", believed to be in honor of a Scottish patriot, John Hamilton, 2nd Lord Belhaven and Stenton, the Northern Neck tobacco trade being then dominated by Scots. The name Belhaven was used in official lotteries to raise money for a Church and Market House, but it was never approved by the legislature and fell out of favor in the mid-1750s. The town of Alexandria did not become incorporated until 1779.

In 1755, General Edward Braddock organized his fatal expedition against Fort Duquesne at Carlyle House in Alexandria. In April 1755, the governors of Virginia, and the provinces of Maryland, Pennsylvania, Massachusetts, and New York met to determine upon concerted action against the French in America.

In March 1785, commissioners from Virginia and Maryland met in Alexandria to discuss the commercial relations of the two states, finishing their business at Mount Vernon. The Mount Vernon Conference concluded on March 28 with an agreement for freedom of trade and freedom of navigation of the Potomac River. The Maryland legislature, in ratifying this agreement on November 22, proposed a conference among representatives from all the states to consider the adoption of definite commercial regulations. This led to the calling of the Annapolis Convention of 1786, which in turn led to the calling of the Federal Convention of 1787.

In 1791, Alexandria was included in the area chosen by George Washington to become the District of Columbia.

Early 19th century 

In 1814, during the War of 1812, a British fleet launched a successful Raid on Alexandria, which surrendered without a fight. As agreed in the terms of surrender the British looted stores and warehouses of mainly flour, tobacco, cotton, wine, and sugar. In 1823 William Holland Wilmer, Francis Scott Key, and others founded the Virginia Theological Seminary. From 1828 to 1836, Alexandria was home to the Franklin & Armfield Slave Market, one of the largest slave trading companies in the country. By the 1830s, they were sending more than 1,000 slaves annually from Alexandria to their Natchez, Mississippi, New Orleans, and later Texas markets to help meet the demand for slaves in Mississippi and nearby states. Later owned by Price, Birch & Co., the slave pen became a jail under Union occupation.

A portion of the City of Alexandria—most of the area now known as Old Town as well as the areas of the city northeast of what is now King Street—and all of today's Arlington County share the distinction of having been the portion of Virginia ceded to the U.S. Government in 1791 to help form the new District of Columbia. Over time, a movement grew to separate what was called "Alexandria County" from the District of Columbia. As competition grew with the port of Georgetown and the Chesapeake and Ohio Canal fostered development on the north side of the Potomac River, Alexandria's economy stagnated; at the same time, residents had lost any representation in Congress and the right to vote, and were disappointed with the negligible economic benefit (on the Alexandria side) of being part of the national capital. Alexandria still had an important port and market in the slave trade, and as talk increased of abolishing slavery in the national capital, there was concern that Alexandria's economy would suffer greatly if this step were taken. After a referendum, voters petitioned Congress and Virginia to return the portion of the District of Columbia south of the Potomac River (Alexandria County) to Virginia. On July 9, 1846, Congress retroceded Alexandria County to Virginia. The City of Alexandria was re-chartered in 1852 and became independent of Alexandria County in 1870. The remaining portion of Alexandria County changed its name to Arlington County in 1920.

Late 19th century

The first fatalities of the North and South in the American Civil War occurred in Alexandria. Within a month of the Battle of Fort Sumter, Union troops occupied Alexandria, landing troops at the base of King Street on the Potomac River on May 24, 1861. A few blocks up King Street from their landing site, the commander of the New York Fire Zouaves, Colonel Elmer E. Ellsworth, sortied with a small detachment to remove a large Confederate flag displayed on the roof of the Marshall House Inn that had been visible from the White House. While descending from the roof, Ellsworth was shot dead by James W. Jackson, the hotel's proprietor. One of Ellsworth's soldiers immediately killed Jackson. Ellsworth was publicized as a Union martyr, and the incident generated great excitement in the North, with many children being named for him. Jackson's death defending his home caused a similar sensation in the South.

Alexandria remained under military occupation until the end of the war. Fort Ward, one of a ring of forts built by the Union army for the defense of Washington, D.C., is located inside the boundaries of present-day Alexandria. There were five military prisons in the city, the largest being the Washington Street Military Prison. After the creation by Washington of the state of West Virginia in 1863 and until the close of the war, Alexandria was the seat of the so-called Restored Government of Virginia, also known as the "Alexandria Government". During the Union occupation, a recurring contention between the Alexandria citizenry and the military occupiers was the Union army's periodic insistence that church services include prayers for the President of the United States. Failure to do so resulted in incidents including the arrest of ministers in their church.

In 1861 and 1862, escaped African-American slaves poured into Alexandria. Safely behind Union lines, the cities of Alexandria and Washington offered comparative freedom and employment. Alexandria became a major supply depot and transport and hospital center for the Union army. Until the Emancipation Proclamation of January 1, 1863, escaped slaves legally remained the property of their owners. Therefore, they were labeled contrabands to avoid returning them to their masters. Contrabands worked for the Union army in various support roles.

After all slaves in the seceding states were liberated, even more African Americans came to Alexandria. By the fall of 1863, the population of Alexandria had exploded to 18,000an increase of 10,000 people in 16 months.

As of ratification of the Fifteenth Amendment, Alexandria County's black population was more than 8,700, or about half the total number of residents in the county. This newly enfranchised constituency provided the support necessary to elect the first black Alexandrians to the City Council and the Virginia Legislature.

20th century

At the turn of the 20th century the most common production in the city was glass, fertilizer, beer, and leather. The glass often went into beer bottles. Much of the Virginia Glass Company effort went to supply the demands of the Robert Portner Brewing Company, until fire destroyed the St. Asaph Street plant on February 18, 1905. The Old Dominion Glass Company also had a glass works fall to fire, then built a new one. The Belle Pre Bottle Company held a monopoly on a milk bottle that they patented, yet that organization only lasted 10 years. Most businesses were smaller where the business occupied the first floor of a building and the owner and family lived above. Prohibition closed Portner Brewing in 1916.

In 1930, Alexandria annexed the town adjacent to Potomac Yard incorporated in 1908 named Potomac. In 1938 the Mt. Vernon Drive-In cinema opened. In 1939, the segregated public library experienced a sit-in organized by Samuel Wilbert Tucker. In 1940, both the Robert Robinson Library, which is now the Alexandria Black History Museum, and the Vernon Theatre opened Jim Morrison of The Doors, as well as Cass Elliot and John Phillips of The Mamas & The Papas attended the George Washington High School in the 1950s.

In 1955, then-Congressman and future President Gerald R. Ford and his family moved to Alexandria from Georgetown. The Fords remained in their Alexandria home during Ford's tenure as Vice President (1973-1974), as the Vice President did not yet have an official residence. Following the resignation of Richard Nixon, Ford spent his first 10 days as President in the house before moving to the White House.

In March 1959, Lieutenant Colonel William Henry Whalen, the "highest-ranking American ever recruited as a mole by the Russian Intelligence Service", provided Colonel Sergei A. Edemski three classified Army manuals in exchange for $3,500 at a shopping center parking lot within the city. Agents of the Federal Bureau of Investigation later arrested Whalen on July 12, 1966, at his home in the city. In 1961 the original Woodrow Wilson Bridge opened.

In 1965, the city integrated schools. In 1971, the city consolidated all high school students into T. C. Williams High School. The same year that head coach Herman Boone joined the school and lead the football team to a 13–0 season, a state championship, and a national championship runner-up; the basis for the 2000 film Remember the Titans where Boone was portrayed by Denzel Washington. In 1972, Clifford T. Cline purchased the 1890 Victorian house at 219 King Street and converted it into the Creole serving Two-Nineteen Restaurant. In 1973, Nora Lamborne and Beverly Beidler became the first women elected to the city council. In 1974, the Torpedo Factory Art Center opened. In 1983, the King Street–Old Town station, Braddock Road station, and Eisenhower Avenue station opened as the Washington Metro system expanded. In 1991, the Van Dorn Street station opened and Patricia Ticer became the first woman elected mayor.

History of libraries 

John Wise, a local Alexandria businessman and hotel keeper, hosted a meeting in his home in 1789 to discuss the creation of a Society for the Promotion of Useful Knowledge. Members include Rev. James Muir, physician Elisha Cullen Dick, and George Washington's personal attorney Charles Lee. The Society did not last for long. However, on July 24, 1794, the founders of the Society once again met at Wise's home to establish a subscription library. During the first year, one hundred nineteen men joined the circulating library which was to be called the Library Company of Alexandria. Members agreed to pay an initiation fee and annual dues. The company was chartered as a corporation in 1798 in an act passed by the General Assembly of Virginia.

Druggist Edward Stabler was elected the first librarian and the library's first location is believed to have been housed in his apothecary shop. James Kennedy was elected the second librarian, and the library moved to his residence and place of business. Kennedy sold books from his personal collection to the Library Company. Those books and other bought from two local merchants formed the foundation of the subscription library. The first catalog of the library's collection was published in 1797. The collection grew over time, bolstered in part by the fact that some members paid their dues in books. Most members were initially men, although records exist showing some women were members as early as 1798. One noted female member in 1817 was Mary L.F. Custis, wife of George Washington Parke Custis.

The catalog published in 1801 indicated a collection of 452 books, mostly on history and travel. By 1815, there were 1,022 entries in the catalog, and the collection had added more biographies, fiction, and magazines. The library was housed in several locations over the ensuing years, including the New Market House next to the City Hall, the Lyceum Company building, and Peabody Hall, which was owned by the Alexandria School Board. Raising funds for the library was a continuing challenge. In 1853, a lecture series was created to raise money. Speakers included Professor Joseph Henry of the Smithsonian, Colonel Francis H. Smith of the Virginia Military Institute, and humorist George W. Bagby.

The Civil War took its toll on the library collection. Members were able to remove some of the collection prior to the library's occupation by Union troops. The library was used as a hospital and much of the library's collection was lost during this time. After the war, the building was sold to a private owner who planned to turn the building into a private residence and asked the library to remove what was left of the collection. Funds continued to be hard to come by and in 1879, the Library Company closed. The remainder of its collection was stored in Peabody Hall.

In 1897, a group of women in Alexandria formed the Alexandria Library Association. The leaders of the group were Virginia Corse, Mrs. William B. Smoot, and Virginia Burke. They petitioned the school board to open a subscription library in Peabody Hall, using the old books stored there. Permission was given and doors to the new subscription library opened on December 1, 1897. In 1902, the library moved to the first floor of a house in the 1300 block of Prince Street while negotiations were underway for a permanent move to the Confederate Hall, located at 806 Prince Street. In May 1903, the library moved to the Confederate Hall, now known as the Robert E. Lee Camp Hall Museum, where it stayed for 34 years.

In 1936, Dr. and Mrs. Robert South Barrett presented a proposal to the Library Association. They agreed to donate a building in memory of Dr. Barrett's mother, Kate Waller Barrett, if the city would commit to running it as a public library. The city agreed and the Society of Friends offered a 99-year lease on an old Quaker graveyard located on Queen Street. The old library was closed on March 1 for the books to be packed and moved to the new library, which opened to the public in August 1937. The Alexandria Library Association became the Alexandria Library Society.

In 1939, the Barrett library was the scene of possibly the nation's first sit-in demonstrations, as Samuel Tucker, a young law school graduate from the neighborhood, and several other African-American residents insisted on access to the racially segregated library where they had been banned. Tucker later became a prominent attorney in Richmond.

In 1947, the Library Society was reconstituted and took the earlier historic name Alexandria Library Company. A lecture series was also revived. Speakers included Thomas Jefferson biographer Dumas Malone. Some of the books belonging in the original collection of the Alexandria Library Company can now be found in the Local History/Special Collections Room at the Queen Street library that still carries Mrs. Barrett's name.

In 1948, Ellen Coolidge Burke became director. Burke brought bookmobile services to Alexandria, one of the first services in Virginia. She oversaw the growth of the library system by the addition of two new branch libraries. In April 1968 the Ellen Coolidge Burke Branch at 4701 Seminary Road was opened, and in December 1969 the James M. Duncan branch at 2501 Commonwealth Avenue. Burke retired in 1969.

Geography 
Alexandria is bounded on the east by the Potomac River, on the north and northwest by Arlington County, and on the south by Fairfax County. The western portions of the city were annexed from those two entities beginning in the 1930s.

The addressing system in Alexandria is not uniform and reflects the consolidation of several originally separate communities into a single city. In Old Town Alexandria, building numbers are assigned north and south from King Street and west (only) from the Potomac River. In the areas formerly in the town of Potomac, such as Del Ray and St. Elmo, building numbers are assigned east and west from Commonwealth Avenue and north (only) from King Street. In the western parts of the city, building numbers are assigned north and south from Duke Street.

The ZIP Code prefix 223 uniquely identifies the Alexandria postal area. However, the Alexandria postal area extends into Fairfax County and includes addresses outside of the city. Delivery areas have ZIP codes 22301, 22302, 22303, 22304, 22305, 22306, 22307, 22308, 22309, 22310, 22311, 22312, 22314, and 22315, with other ZIP codes in use for post office boxes and large mailers (22313, 22331, 22332, 22333).

Part of the George Washington Memorial Parkway is the one national protected area within the borders of Alexandria.

Adjacent jurisdictions

Neighborhoods 

Neighborhoods in the City of Alexandria include Old Town, Parker-Gray, The Berg, Arlandria, Rosemont, Del Ray, Beverley Hills, Braddock Heights, Eisenhower Valley, Seminary Valley, Temple Park, West End, and Potomac Yard. 

Many areas outside the city have an Alexandria mailing address yet are a part of Fairfax County including: Hollin Hills, Franconia, Groveton, Hybla Valley, Huntington, Lincolnia, Belle Haven, Mount Vernon, Fort Hunt, Engleside, Burgundy Village, Waynewood, Wilton Woods, Rose Hill, Virginia Hills, Hayfield, and Kingstowne. Some refer to these areas as Lower Alexandria, South Alexandria, or Alexandria, Fairfax County.

Climate 
The climate in this area is characterized by hot, humid summers and generally mild to cool winters. According to the Köppen climate classification system, Alexandria has a humid subtropical climate, abbreviated "Cfa" on climate maps.

Demographics

2020 Census

Note: the US Census treats Hispanic/Latino as an ethnic category. This table excludes Latinos from the racial categories and assigns them to a separate category. Hispanics/Latinos can be of any race.

2010 Census
At the 2010 census, there were 139,966 people, 68,082 households and 30,978 families residing in the city. The racial/ethnic mix of the population was :
 60.9% White
 21.8% African American
 6.0% Asian (1.3% Indian, 1.0% Filipino, 0.9% Chinese, 0.8% Korean, 0.5% Thai, 0.3% Vietnamese, 0.2% Japanese, 1.0% Other)
 0.4% Native American
 0.1% Pacific Islander
 3.7% from two or more races
 16.1% of the population were Hispanics or Latinos of any national origin (4.6% Salvadoran, 1.7% Mexican, 1.6% Honduran, 1.1% Guatemalan, 1.1% Puerto Rican, 0.9% Bolivian, 0.8% Peruvian, 0.4% Colombian)

In 2000, there were 61,889 households, of which 18.6% had children under the age of 18 living with them, 32.2% were married couples living together, 9.2% had a female householder with no husband present, and 55.2% were non-families. 43.4% of all households were made up of individuals, and 6.8% had someone living alone who was 65 years of age or older. The average household size was 2.04 and the average family size was 2.87.

The age distribution was 16.8% under the age of 18, 9.2% from 18 to 24, 43.5% from 25 to 44, 21.5% from 45 to 64, and 9.0% who were 65 years of age or older. The median age was 34 years. For every 100 females, there were 93.5 males. For every 100 females age 18 and over, there were 91.7 males.

According to 2019 Census Bureau data, the median household income was $103,284 and median family income was $130,395. Additionally, 8.6% of the population of the population were below the poverty line. 14.2% of those under the age of 18 and 3.1% of those 65 and older were living below the poverty line.

65.4% of Alexandria residents age 25 and older have attained a bachelor's degree or higher, compared with 41.8% statewide.

Economy 

Companies headquartered in Alexandria include the Institute for Defense Analyses, VSE, The Motley Fool, Port City Brewing Company, ThinkFun, Oblon law firm, Mandiant, BoatUS, and the Pentagon Federal Credit Union.

Federal agencies based in Alexandria include the National Credit Union Administration, the U.S. Patent and Trademark Office, National Science Foundation, Office of the Inspector General, U.S. Department of Defense, and the Food and Nutrition Service.

Alexandria is home to numerous trade associations, charities, and non-profit organizations including the national headquarters of groups such as Catholic Charities, Citizens for the Republic, Global Impact, Good360, Islamic Relief USA, United Way, Volunteers of America and the Salvation Army. Other organizations located in Alexandria include the American Counseling Association, the Human Resource Certification Institute, the Society for Human Resource Management, the National Society of Professional Engineers, the National Beer Wholesalers Association, National Industries for the Blind, American Physical Therapy Association and the International Centre for Missing & Exploited Children (ICMEC). Alexandria also has a Chamber of Commerce and other business associations including the West End Business Association, the Del Ray Business Association and the Old Town Business Association.

Major employment sectors in Alexandria include management consulting, business and finance, office and administrative support, computer and mathematical, sales, and legal. In total, firms in Alexandria employ approximately 91,000 people.  Jobs in Alexandria are highly concentrated around the city's Metrorail stations, primarily in Old Town North and the Braddock Road area, Old Town, and Carlyle near the Eisenhower Avenue Station, as well as along the I-395 corridor on the west side of the city.

13% of people that work in Alexandria live in the city, while 87% commute in, with 37% of those commuters being from Fairfax County. An additional 61,000 people commute out of Alexandria to work. 35% commute to Washington, DC and 29% commute to Fairfax County. As of 2022, 2.4% of Alexandria residents are unemployed.

Largest employers 
According to the city's 2022 Comprehensive Annual Financial Report, the top public employers in the city are:

The top private employers in the city are:

Arts and culture

Events 
A popular Christmas time attraction in Alexandria is the Scottish Christmas Walk, which was established in 1969. The event, which involves a parade through the center of Old Town Alexandria, celebrates the city's Scottish heritage, and is the centerpiece of a yearly holiday festival. It serves as a fundraiser for social services in Alexandria. Other parades in Old Town celebrate Saint Patrick's Day and the birthday of George Washington. Other annual events include the Red Cross Waterfront Festival in June, the city's birthday celebration with fireworks show in July, various ethnic heritage days at Tavern Square, and "First Night Alexandria", which presents many family-friendly entertainments on New Year's Eve.

These parades and other official events are typically led by Alexandria's town crier, who, often dressed in elaborately, by a tradition dating to the 18th century, in a red coat, breeches, black boots and a tricorne hat, welcomes participants.

Landmarks 

Landmarks within the city include the George Washington Masonic National Memorial (also known as the Masonic Temple) and Observation Deck, Christ Church, Gadsby's Tavern, John Carlyle House, Little Theatre of Alexandria, Lee-Fendall House, Alexandria City Hall, Market Square, the Jones Point Light, the south cornerstone of the original District of Columbia, Robert E. Lee's boyhood home, the Torpedo Factory Art Center, and the Virginia Theological Seminary. Other sites of historical interest in the city include Alexandria Black History Resource Center, Fort Ward Park and Museum, and the Alexandria Canal lock re-creation at Canal Office Center. Interesting sites with Alexandria addresses but outside of the city limits include River Farm, Collingwood Library & Museum, Green Spring Gardens Park, Huntley Meadows Park, Historic Huntley, Pope-Leighey House (designed by Frank Lloyd Wright), Woodlawn Plantation, Washington's Grist Mill and Mount Vernon Estate.

In 1830, John Hollensbury's home in Alexandria was one of two homes directly bordering an alleyway that received a large amount of horse-drawn wagon traffic and loiterers. The brick walls of the Hollensbury Spite House living room have gouges from wagon-wheel hubs; the house is still standing, and is occupied.

The Oswald Durant Center in the Upper King Street neighborhood of the Old Town is named after Dr. Oswald Durant, one of the first African American doctors in Alexandria.

Sports 
Due to its proximity to Washington, Alexandria has only been the home of one professional sports team, the Alexandria Dukes, a minor league baseball team which moved to Woodbridge in 1984 to become The Prince William Pirates (now known as the Fredericksburg Nationals).

Parks and recreation 
Alexandria has a distributed park system with approximately  spread across 70 major parks and 30 recreation centers, of which Chinquapin is one of the largest. Chinquapin offers facilities for swimming, tennis, racquetball, and other sports. The city also organizes several sports leagues throughout the year including volleyball, softball and basketball.

The city is home to Cameron Run Regional Park which includes a water park with a wave pool and water slides, as well as a miniature golf course and batting cages. A portion of the Mount Vernon Trail, a popular bike and jogging path, runs through Old Town near the Potomac River on its way from the Mount Vernon Estate to Roosevelt Island in Washington, DC. There is also a largely unbroken line of parks stretching along the Alexandria waterfront from end to end.

Government 

As an independent city of Virginia (as opposed to an incorporated town within a county), Alexandria derives its governing authority from the Virginia General Assembly. In order to revise the power and structure of the city government, the city must request the General Assembly to amend the charter. This is called Dillon Rule. The present charter was granted in 1950 and it has been amended in 1968, 1971, 1976, and 1982.

Alexandria adopted a council-manager form of government by way of referendum in 1921. This type of government empowers the elected City Council to pass legislation and appoint the City Manager. The City Manager is responsible for overseeing the city's administration.

The Mayor, who is chosen on a separate ballot, presides over meetings of the Council and serves as the ceremonial head of government. The Mayor does not have the power to veto Council action. Council members traditionally choose the person receiving the most votes in the election to serve as Vice Mayor. In the absence or disability of the Mayor, the Vice Mayor performs the mayoral duties.

In 2008, the City of Alexandria had 78 standing local boards, commissions, and committees to advise the City Council on major issues affecting the community. All members are appointed by the City Council.

In addition, Alexandria City Public Schools has a school board with nine members. Three are elected from each of the city's three school board districts.

Alexandria is part of Virginia's 8th congressional district, represented by Democrat and Alexandria resident Don Beyer, elected in 2014. The state's senior member of the United States Senate is Democrat Mark Warner, first elected in 2008. The state's junior member of the United States Senate is Democrat Tim Kaine, first elected in 2012.

History
Since its foundation, Alexandria's government has had several different forms of government. Before 1921, Alexandria had an elected eight-member Board of Aldermen and a sixteen-member Common Council whose members were elected by ward. In addition, there was an elected mayor with the power to veto legislation from the two councils. Reformers within the city during the early 20th century hoped to adopt the then-popular council-manager system. As a means to implementing this new system, the reformists proposed a plan to create a single city council elected at-large. This new system was adopted in 1921 and the first at-large councilmen were elected in June 1922.

In 1930, Alexandria annexed the town of Potomac from Arlington County. Alexandria and Potomac stood in stark contrast. The streetcar suburb commuter town of Potomac had, as part of Arlington, been heavily influenced by the anti-vice crusades of staunch progressive Commonwealth's Attorney Crandal Mackey. In Potomac, slaughterhouses and saloons were banned. Residents of the former town of Potomac had a different identity from those in Alexandria, and after annexation former Potomac residents began to push for the reimplementation of the ward system. In a 1932 referendum, voters decided in favor of a new plan that would expand the city council to nine members; three elected at-large and six elected by ward. Support for the new  plan was highest in the former town of Potomac.

City councils elected under the new ward system began to take a more direct role in city administration. The city council and city manager gave conflicting orders to city employees while spending increased to accommodate appropriations coming from both the council and manager. With over one million dollars spent on unauthorized projects, a movement to go back to at-large councilmen emerged. In 1944, a referendum to eliminate the ward system ended with a vote in favor of the ward system. Shortly afterwards, a number of high-ranking city officials resigned and residents appealed to the Circuit Court for an order to force a referendum. Unbeknownst to the city government, Delegate Armistead Boothe introduced a bill in Richmond to hold another referendum. This bill passed the General Assembly and a vote was held on March 2, 1948. The options in the referendum included retaining the extant system or replacing it with a council of seven at-large members. Voters approved the new system with 61% of votes in favor. More recently, a 1983 push by the Virginia NAACP to return to the ward system failed because of a lack of support from elected officials.

Ecocity 
In 2008 the city council approved a charter where "citizens, businesses, and city government participate in a vibrant community that is always mindful of the needs and lifestyles of the generations to come". That charter defined sustainability as "meeting our community's present needs while preserving our historic character and ensuring the ability of future generations to meet their own needs". In Ecocity Berkeley, an ecocity is defined as "an ecologically healthy city". In 2022, Alexandria enacted a 5-cent plastic bag tax consistent with the phase-out of lightweight plastic bags in the United States.

Public safety

Police and law enforcement 

Alexandria's primary law enforcement is the Alexandria Police Department (APD) which is led by a Chief of Police who is appointed by city government. In April 2022, Don Hayes was appointed as Chief of Police. As of 2023, the APD employs roughly 300 officers that receive training at the Northern Virginia Criminal Justice Training Academy.

Every four years, Alexandria residents elect a sheriff that leads the Sheriff's Office in overseeing roughly 200 deputies and a detention center for pre-trial and short-term inmates. This jail is used to house pre-trial inmates in federal espionage cases.

Firefighting 

The Alexandria Fire Department (AFD) is the city's fire protection and emergency medical services provider and is led by Fire/EMS Chief Corey A. Smedley. The AFD operates 10 stations throughout the city and employs over 300 fire and EMS professionals.

Education

Colleges and universities
Virginia Tech's Washington-Alexandria Architecture Center, also known as WAAC, is located on Prince Street in Old Town, offering graduate programs in Urban Affairs and Planning, Public and International Affairs, Architecture, and Landscape Architecture. Virginia Commonwealth University operates a Northern Virginia branch of its School of Social Work and The George Washington University also has a campus near the King Street metro. This campus mainly offers professional and vocational programs, such as an executive MBA program, urban planning and security studies. It also includes the Alexandria campus of Northern Virginia Community College. The largest seminary in the Episcopal Church, Virginia Theological Seminary, is located on Seminary Road.

Primary and secondary schools

The city is served by the Alexandria City Public Schools system. Alexandria's public school system consists of twelve elementary schools for grades 5-year-old Kindergarten through 5th grade, with 3 of them offering PreK as well. Two schools, Patrick Henry and Jefferson-Houston are PreK through 8th grade schools while Middle Schools, George Washington and Francis C. Hammond, serve 6th through 8th graders. Minnie Howard Ninth Grade Center and Alexandria City High School serve grades 9th and 10 through 12, respectively, for the entire city. The demographics of Alexandria City Public Schools contrast with those of the city. In 2008, only 14% of the students at Francis C. Hammond Middle School were non-Hispanic whites, compared to about 60% when looking at the city as a whole. 27% were of Hispanic descent, and 48% were black. About 9% of the school was of Asian descent. In 2004, 62% of the school-going children received free lunches; by 2008, that number had decreased to 56%. At George Washington Middle School, 41% of students are non-Hispanic whites, 34% were Hispanic, and 21% was black; 2% of the students were Asian, and 52% of students received free lunch. Alexandria City High School (formerly known as T.C. Williams High School) follows this trend as well; 23% of the students were classified as non-Hispanic whites, 25% as Hispanic, and 44% as black. 7% of the school was Asian, and 47% of all students received free lunch.

In November 2020, the school board unanimously voted to rename T. C. Williams High School and Matthew Maury Elementary School. The high school was renamed Alexandria City High School and Maury Elementary was renamed Naomi L. Brooks Elementary School, effective July 1, 2021.

The Department of Defense Education Activity (DoDEA), the federal school system for military dependents, is headquartered in Alexandria. 

Alexandria has several of the Washington, D.C., area's top private schools, such as St. Stephen's and St. Agnes School, Bishop Ireton High School, and Episcopal High School. Also in the city are Alexandria Country Day School, Commonwealth Academy, the Basilica School of Saint Mary, St. Rita's Catholic School, Blessed Sacrament School and Global Health College.

Public libraries 

The Alexandria Library serves the residents of Alexandria, and provides a variety of services which include adult, young adult, and children's materials, as well as access to genealogy records and full text articles from thousands of magazines and newspapers through online databases. E-Books can be borrowed through OverDrive e-Audio books and all branches offer free public Internet access and free Wifi.

The Alexandria Library maintains a reciprocal agreement with neighboring libraries in Arlington, District of Columbia, Fairfax, Falls Church, Fauquier, Frederick, Loudoun, Montgomery, Prince George's, and Prince William.

Transportation

Bus and rail

The Alexandria city government operates its own mass transit system, the DASH bus, connecting points of interest with local transit hubs. In 2021, DASH underwent route redesigns and became fare-free. Metrobus, Washington Metro, and the Virginia Railway Express, better known as the VRE, also serve Alexandria. The city also offers a free "trolley" diesel bus service on King Street from the King Street Metro Station to the Waterfront. Hornblower Cruises operates the Potomac Water Taxi to and from Georgetown and The Wharf development in Washington, DC and the National Harbor development in Prince George's County, Maryland.

Alexandria Union Station, the city's historic train station, has Amtrak intercity services and the Virginia Railway Express regional rail service. The station is directly adjacent to the King Street – Old Town Washington Metro station, at the convergence of the Blue and Yellow Lines. Three other Metro stations in Alexandria are Braddock Road, Van Dorn Street, and Eisenhower Avenue; a Potomac Yard station is scheduled to open in May 2023.

The traditional boundary between Old Town and the latterly annexed sections of the city follows the railway acquired by Virginia in 2021 and formerly owned by CSX Transportation.

Roads

Concurrent Interstate highways 95 and 495 (the Capital Beltway), including the Woodrow Wilson Bridge over the Potomac River, roughly parallels the city's southern boundary with Fairfax County before very briefly passing through D.C. and entering Maryland. Interstate 395 crosses north and south through the western part of the city.

Alexandria is bisected east and west by State Route 7, known as King Street. The most western section of King Street in the city was once the terminus of the Leesburg Turnpike. VA 7 terminates at State Route 400 (Washington Street), which connects the northern and southern segments of George Washington Memorial Parkway (GWMP). State Route 236 runs east-west along the southern side of the city, also terminating at VA 400 in Old Town.

Other primary state highways serving Alexandria include the short limited-access State Route 241 (which connects the beltway and VA 236/Duke Street), as well as multiple thoroughfares serving the western side of the city, which are State Route 401 (Van Dorn Street), State Route 402 (Quaker Lane), and State Route 420 (Seminary Road in the west, Janneys Lane in the east).

U.S. Route 1 passes north-south through the city, parallel west of Washington Street and GWMP. Through Old Town, the highway follows Patrick and Henry Streets, named after Patrick Henry. In 2019, the name of U.S. 1 was changed from Jefferson Davis Highway to Richmond Highway. Until 2014, local legislation mandated that all new north–south streets in the city be named for Confederate military leaders. Efforts have increased in recent years to expedite the renaming of these streets with Mayor Justin Wilson and the City Council setting a goal of renaming three of these streets annually.

Airports
Alexandria is adjacent to Ronald Reagan Washington National Airport in Arlington County. Alexandria is also near to Washington Dulles International Airport in Dulles, Virginia.

Cycling
In 2012, Capital Bikeshare, a bicycle-sharing public transportation system, launched in Alexandria. By early 2022, the system will operate 61 rental locations throughout the city.

The East Coast Greenway and Mount Vernon Trail cycle routes pass through Alexandria.

Notable people 
 Diedrich Bader, actor
 Hannibal Brumskine III, internet entrepreneur
 Stewart Copeland, drummer for The Police
 Leon Day, Hall of Fame baseball pitcher who played in the Negro leagues 
 Elena Delle Donne, forward-guard, Washington Mystics, WNBA champion, two-time league MVP
 Stefon Diggs, wide receiver for the Buffalo Bills
 Donna Dixon, former actress, model
 William O. Douglas, American jurist who served as an Associate Justice of the Supreme Court of the US 1939–75, and environmentalist resided in Old Town for four decades
 Chad Dukes, Alexandria, Virginia radio personality, pioneer in podcasting
 Cass Elliot and John Phillips of The Mamas & The Papas
 Charles Esten, actor, singer
 Margaret Fetterolf, previously unidentified murder victim discovered in Woodlawn, Baltimore County, Maryland in 1976, identified in 2021
 Gerald R. Ford, former President of the United States, lived at 1521 Mount Eagle Place in Parkfairfax, and later at 514 Crown View Drive, where he lived during his term as vice president and for the first ten days of his presidency
 Rick Franklin, a Piedmont blues guitarist, singer and songwriter, was born in Alexandria
 Dave Grohl, founder and frontman of Foo Fighters, drummer for Nirvana 
 Moses Hepburn, first African American town councilor of West Chester, Pennsylvania 
 Sarah Gibson Jones, African American educator, journalist, poet, lecturer, and clubwoman
 Archie Kao, actor, who grew up in Alexandria and graduated from George Mason University in nearby Fairfax, Virginia.
 Thomas Kail, theater director
 Gregory Lawler, mathematician who won the 2019 Wolf Prize in mathematics
 Henry Lee III, often known by his nickname "Light-Horse Harry", Revolutionary War lieutenant colonel, Virginia Governor, father of Robert E. Lee moved to Alexandria in 1810
 Robert E. Lee, Civil War general, grew up on Oronoco Street
 Thad Levine, general manager of Minnesota Twins, was born in Alexandria
 Emma Louise Lowe, American musician, educator, former First Lady of American Samoa and former First Lady of Guam
 Noah Lyles, Olympian
 Scott McKenzie, musician
 Jim Morrison of The Doors lived at 310 Woodland Terrace 1959–61
 Dean Muhtadi, former American football player and former WWE wrestler
 Dermot Mulroney, American Actor, known for his role in My Best Friend's Wedding, among others
 Mick Mulvaney, Director of the Office of Management and Budget and former U.S. Congressman representing South Carolina, born in Alexandria
 Richard M. Nixon, former President of the United States, lived at 3426 Gunston Rd in Parkfairfax
 Sandie Pendleton, Lieutenant Colonel in the C.S Army, Adjutant to Stonewall Jackson and other Confederate Generals.
 Eddie Royal, Chicago Bears wide receiver
 Willard Scott, national television personality, grew up in Rosemont
 Garren Stitt, actor known for his roles in General Hospital and Andi Mack
 Nicholas Trist, Diplomat who negotiated the Treaty of Guadeloupe Hidalgo
 Kali Uchis, singer
 Wernher von Braun, NASA rocket scientist, residence on Vicar Lane, buried in Ivy Hill Cemetery
 Ella Wall Van Leer, American artist, architect and women's rights activist
 Richard Hooker Wilmer, former Episcopal bishop, second Bishop of Alabama
 Megan Young, Miss World Philippines 2013 and Miss World 2013

In popular culture 

 The PBS TV series Mercy Street is set in Alexandria during the Civil War
 The Walking Dead comic book series and subsequent TV adaptation features a protected area of Alexandria known as the Safe Zone.
 The 2000 film Remember the Titans about T.C. Williams High School football team's 1971 State championship team, takes place in Alexandria and the cemetery scene was filmed at Ivy Hill Cemetery in Alexandria. However, the school featured in the movie was not the actual T.C. Williams High School in Alexandria.
 Alternative rock band the Foo Fighters has a track titled "Arlandria" on their 2011 release Wasting Light; front man (and ex-Nirvana drummer) Dave Grohl lived in Alexandria during the early 2000s and recorded two Foo Fighters albums in his home studio. The Arlandria neighborhood is also referenced in the song "Headwires" from the band's 1999 release, There Is Nothing Left to Lose.
 In The X-Files, the address of Special Agent Fox Mulder is given as Apartment 42, 2630 Hegal Place, Alexandria, VA 23242.

Sister cities 
Alexandria has four sister cities:

  Gyumri, Shirak Province, Armenia
  Helsingborg, Skåne County, Sweden
  Dundee, Scotland
  Caen, Calvados,  France

Alexandria was twinned with Gyumri as a means of showing goodwill in the wake of the 1988 Armenian earthquake.

See also 

 Alexandria Police Department
 Alexandria Fire Department
 List of famous people from the Washington, D.C. metropolitan area
 Mòd
 National Register of Historic Places listings in Alexandria, Virginia
 Wales Brewery

References

Further reading 
 
 Powell, Mary G., The History of Old Alexandria Virginia, Richmond: William Byrd Press, 1928.
 Seale, William. The Alexandria Library Company, Alexandria, VA: Alexandria Library, 2007.

 
Cities in Virginia
Northern Virginia
Washington metropolitan area
Virginia populated places on the Potomac River
Populated places established in 1695
1695 establishments in Virginia
Art gallery districts
History of the District of Columbia
Cities in the Baltimore–Washington metropolitan area
Majority-minority counties and independent cities in Virginia